The Chester Bjerg Formation is a geologic formation part of the Peary Land Group in Greenland. It preserves fossils dating back to the Silurian period.

See also

 List of fossiliferous stratigraphic units in Greenland

References
 

Silurian Greenland
Silurian northern paleotropical deposits